Knoutsodonta is a genus of dorid nudibranchs in the family Onchidorididae. The radular teeth are an unusual shape and a molecular phylogeny study showed that they are not closely related to some other species of Onchidoris within which genus they were formerly placed.

Species 
Species within the genus Knoutsodonta include:
 Knoutsodonta albonigra (Pruvot-Fol, 1951)
 Knoutsodonta bouvieri (Vayssière, 1919)
 Knoutsodonta brasiliensis (Alvim, Padula & Pimenta, 2011)
 Knoutsodonta cervinoi (Ortea & Urgorri, 1979)
 Knoutsodonta depressa (Alder & Hancock, 1842)
 Knoutsodonta inconspicua (Alder & Hancock, 1851)
 Knoutsodonta jannae (Millen, 1987) - type species
 Knoutsodonta jannaella (Martynov, N. Sanamyan & Korshunova, 2015)
 Knoutsodonta maugeansis (Burn, 1958)
 Knoutsodonta neapolitana (Delle Chiaje, 1841)
 Knoutsodonta oblonga (Alder & Hancock, 1845)
 Knoutsodonta pictoni Furfaro & Trainito, 2017
 Knoutsodonta pusilla (Alder & Hancock, 1845)
 Knoutsodonta reticulata (Ortea, 1979)
 Knoutsodonta sparsa (Alder & Hancock, 1846)
 Knoutsodonta tridactila (Ortea & Ballesteros, 1982)

References

Onchidorididae